MGI may refer to:

 Martín García Island Airport, in Argentina
 Materials Genome Initiative, an federal initiative for materials discovery
 McKinsey Global Institute
 Miss Grand International, a beauty pageant franchise based in Thailand
 Mouse Genome Informatics, an online database
 Jili language (ISO 639:mgi), spoken in Nigeria